Wichrów  is a village in the administrative district of Gmina Kostomłoty, within Środa Śląska County, Lower Silesian Voivodeship, in south-western Poland.

In January 1945, in the village, the Germans carried out a mass executions of prisoners during the "death march" from the subcamp in Miłoszyce to the Gross-Rosen concentration camp. A mass grave of 120 victims was discovered later.

References

Villages in Środa Śląska County